The 1916 Ohio gubernatorial election was held on November 7, 1916. Democratic nominee James M. Cox defeated incumbent Republican Frank B. Willis in a rematch of the 1914 election with 48.40% of the vote.

General election

Candidates
Major party candidates
James M. Cox, Democratic
Frank B. Willis, Republican 

Other candidates
Tom Clifford, Socialist
John H. Dickason, Prohibition

Results

References

1916
Ohio
Gubernatorial